The 2006–07 Moldovan "A" Division season is the 16th since its establishment. A total of 14 teams are contesting the league:

League table

References

External links
 Moldova. Second Level 2006/07 - RSSSF
 "A" Division - moldova.sports.md

Moldovan Liga 1 seasons
2
Moldova